Cobra gunship may refer to a number of helicopters of the Bell Huey family:

 Bell AH-1 Cobra
 Bell 309 KingCobra
 Bell AH-1 SuperCobra